was a Japanese swimmer. He competed in the men's 100 metre backstroke at the 1952 Summer Olympics.

References

External links
 

1925 births
2004 deaths
Olympic swimmers of Japan
Swimmers at the 1952 Summer Olympics
People from Kōchi, Kōchi
Japanese male backstroke swimmers